"Lust in Translation" is an episode of the BBC sitcom, The Green Green Grass. It was first screened on 21 December 2007, as the seventh episode of series three.

Synopsis

Bryan gets more than he bargained for when he meets his new love and the staff's loyalties are severely tested for the events that follow. Llewellyn seizes the opportunity of securing extra labour when Bryan's lustful date arrives with her unexpected family in toe.

Episode cast

References

British TV Comedy Guide for The Green Green Grass
BARB viewing figures

2007 British television episodes
The Green Green Grass episodes